Neil Crang (born 31 December 1949) is an Australian former racing driver.

References

1949 births
Living people
Australian racing drivers
24 Hours of Le Mans drivers
World Sportscar Championship drivers
Place of birth missing (living people)
20th-century Australian people